Amphibian Man (rus. Человек-амфибия) is a science fiction adventure novel by the  Soviet Russian writer Alexander Beliaev. It was published in 1928.

Plot
Argentinean doctor Salvator, a scientist and a maverick surgeon, gives his son, Ichthyander (Ikhtiandr) (Greek etymology: "Fish"+ "Man") a life-saving transplant - a set of shark gills.  The experiment is a success but it limits the young man's ability to interact with the world outside his ocean environment. He has to spend much of his time in water. Pedro Zurita, a local pearl gatherer, learns about Ichthyander and tries to exploit the boy's superhuman diving abilities.

Similar to other works by Beliaev, the book investigates the possibilities of physical survival under extreme conditions, as well as the moral integrity of scientific experiments. It also touches on socialist ideas of improving living conditions for the world's poor.

Other media
The 1962 film adaptation the Amphibian Man (translit. Chelovek-Amfibiya), was directed by Vladimir Chebotaryov. The movie recorded 65 million ticket sales (the actual ticket revenue is unknown) quickly becoming one of the most admired movies in the USSR. Filmed on the South Coast of the Crimea and in Baku and featuring a cast of beautiful young actors, the film features some popular song and dance numbers and has certain characteristics of a musical. The first song and the musical theme of the movie - "The Sea Devil" became such a hit that it was sung well into the 1990s.

A 2004 Russian TV series Sea Devil (Морской Дьявол) was aired, loosely based on the novel.

Translations

 Foreign Languages Publishing House, Moscow
L'Uomo Anfibio, Agenzia Alcatraz, Italia

Cultural influence
Ichthyander Project, underwater habitat
Daphnella ichthyandri, mollusc
Chlorophthalmus ichthyandri, fish

See also

 Aquaman
 Submariner
 1928 in science fiction

References

1928 Russian novels
Novels by Alexander Beliaev
1928 science fiction novels
Russian novels adapted into films
Science fiction novels adapted into films
Soviet science fiction novels